Karl Axel Patrik Norling (16 April 1884 – 7 May 1964) was a Swedish gymnast, diver, and tug of war competitor who participated in the 1906 Intercalated Games and 1908 and 1912 Summer Olympics. He won a bronze medal in the tug of war in 1906, as well as two gold medals with the Swedish gymnastics team, in 1908 and 1912, alongside his younger brother Daniel.

Norling was educated as an engineer. He eventually became head of the Navy Department at AB Separator (later Alfa Laval).

References

1884 births
1964 deaths
Swedish male artistic gymnasts
Swedish male divers
Tug of war competitors at the 1906 Intercalated Games
Divers at the 1906 Intercalated Games
Gymnasts at the 1908 Summer Olympics
Gymnasts at the 1912 Summer Olympics
Olympic tug of war competitors of Sweden
Olympic divers of Sweden
Olympic gymnasts of Sweden
Olympic gold medalists for Sweden
Olympic medalists in gymnastics
Medalists at the 1912 Summer Olympics
Medalists at the 1908 Summer Olympics
Medalists at the 1906 Intercalated Games
Stockholms KK divers
Sportspeople from Stockholm